Jalan Pudu is a major road in Kuala Lumpur, Malaysia. According to the Department of Survey and Mapping, Kuala Lumpur is divided into sections and, smaller still, into lots. A map of Kuala Lumpur from 1895 places Pudu (or Pudoh, as it was back then) in a vast swampy area far from the administrative capital where Sultan Abdul Samad Building still stands.

List of interchanges and junctions

References 

Roads in Kuala Lumpur